beIN Channels Network (stylized as beIN) is a pan-Arab direct broadcast satellite service provider and broadcaster owned by beIN Media Group, which is based in Doha, Qatar.

Technology 
beIN had launched 6 multi-function interactive decoders:

Sagemcom 4K
beIN 1000s
 Humax HD Mini
 Humax C1
 Humax 3030
 Humax 4030

Channels

Sports 

 beIN Sports HD (free channel)
 beIN Sports News HD
 beIN Sports 1 HD
 beIN Sports 2 HD
 beIN Sports 3 HD
 beIN Sports 4 HD
 beIN Sports 5 HD
 beIN Sports 6 HD
 beIN Sports 7 HD
 beIN Sports 1 HD (English)
 beIN Sports 2 HD (English)
 beIN Sports 3 HD (English)
 beIN Sports 1 HD (French)
 beIN Sports 2 HD (French)
 beIN Sports 3 HD (French)
 beIN Sports NBA HD
 beIN Sports 1 Premium HD
 beIN Sports 2 Premium HD
 beIN Sports 3 Premium HD
 beIN Sports XTRA 1 HD
 beIN Sports XTRA 2 HD
 beIN Sports Max 1 HD
 beIN Sports Max 2 HD
 beIN Sports Max 3 HD
 beIN Sports Max 4 HD
 beIN Sports Max 5 HD
 beIN Sports Max 6 HD
 beIN Sports AFC HD
 beIN Sports AFC 1 HD
 beIN Sports AFC 2 HD
 beIN Sports AFC 3 HD
 Alkass 1 HD
 Alkass 2 HD
 Alkass 3 HD
 Alkass 4 HD
 Alkass 5 HD
 Alkass 6 HD
 Alkass 7 HD
 Alkass 8 HD
 Alkass 9 HD
 Alkass 10 HD

Movies 

 beIN Movies Premium HD
 beIN Movies Action HD
 beIN Movies Drama HD
 beIN Movies Family HD
 beIN Box Office 1 HD
 beIN Box Office 2 HD
 Star Movies HD

Entertainment 

 beIN Series 1 HD
 beIN Series 2 HD
 beIN Drama 1 HD
 beIN Gourmet HD
 Star World HD
 Fatafeat HD
 Food Network HD
 HGTV

News 
 CNN International HD
 Al Jazeera Mubasher
 Al Jazeera English HD
 Al Jazeera HD
 Bloomberg
 Al Araby
 France 24 Arabic
 France 24 English
 France 24 French
 BBC World News
 BBC Arabic
 CNBC 
 CNBC Arabiya

Kids 

 Cartoon Network HD
 Cartoon Network Arabic
 Boomerang HD
 BabyTV HD
 Baraem HD
 Jeem HD
 beJunior HD
 CBeebies Middle East HD
 DreamWorks Channel

Documentary 

 National Geographic HD
 Nat Geo Wild HD
 Al Jazeera Documentary HD
 BBC Earth HD
 Discovery Family HD
 Discovery Channel HD
 Discovery Science HD
 Animal Planet HD
  National Geographic Abu Dhabi HD

Music 

Club MTV
MTV 80s
MTV 90s

UHD 

 beIN 4K

See also 
 beIN Sports
MENA
France
Spain (closed in 2019 (Sports) and 2020 (all platforms))
USA
Canada
Australia
Turkey
Hong Kong
Southeast Asia
 beIN Series
 beIN Drama
 beIN Media Group

References

External links 
 
 beIN Connect

Mass media companies established in 2015
2015 establishments in Qatar
Mass media companies of Qatar
Direct broadcast satellite services
BeIN
BeIN Media Group